Richard M. Nathan is an Indian cinematographer, who works in the Tamil film industry.

Career
After graduating from Don Bosco Secondary School, Richard studied Visual Communications at Loyola College, Chennai in 1997. He then subsequently began assisting K. V. Anand and worked on Khakee (2004) and Sivaji (2007). He received a nomination from the Vijay Awards for the Best Cinematographer category for his work in his debut venture, Vasanthabalan's Angadi Theru (2010), where he shot on the streets of the crowded Ranganathan Theru in Chennai. During the auditions for the film, he set out with a friend and a borrowed HD camera, spending 24 hours on the street and came back with a video which impressed Vasanthabalan, which made him sign Richard on for the film in 2007.
Critics also praised his work describing "his shots were among the highlights" of the film, "with superb night effect shots of Chennai streets". He was subsequently chosen by K. V. Anand to be the cinematographer for Ko (2011), winning acclaim for his shots in Norway and his work in the songs.

He then partnered up with director Thiru for the Vishal starrers Samar (2013) and Naan Sigappu Manithan (2014), filming scenes in Bangkok and getting good reviews from critics.
He won further critical acclaim and plaudits for his work in Vanakkam Chennai (2013).

It is widely believed that all the movies he acts in Cameo roles have become a box office hit . His movies Ko , Trisha Illana Nayanthara and his recent picture Appa  are all considered box office hits.

Richard is teaming up with Thiru again for their 3rd project together Mr. Chandramouli starting from November 2018.

He has completed Kaali with music director turned actor Vijay Antony and will be starting his next movie with the same Actor in February 2018 titled Thimiru Pudichavan

On 9 November 2017 his movie Ippadai Vellum starring Udhayanidhi Stalin was released, to become an average grosser. With his works gained a lot of accolades.

Richard joined hands with music director turned actor turned producer Vijay Antony second time for Thimir Pudichavan . It is to be noted that Richard M Nathan keeps doing repeated work with his heros'. 

In 2019 , Richard gave a blockbuster family entertainer Comali with yet another debut director Prasanna. Comali starred actor Jayam Ravi and Kajal Agarwal. This movie was considered one of the greatest hits of 2019. His cinematography for the Chennai floods portion was widely appreciated. 

Richard's second consecutive blockbuster was Maanaadu by Venkat Prabhu , starring the trim and young looking Simbhu. It become the biggest hit in recent times . Maanaadu, topped the 2021 best movie list and still considered one of the best performances of SJ Surya and Simbhu.  

2022 has seen 1 release of DOP Richard. Enna Solla Pogirai with another debut director Hari and a newcomer yet a familiar face Cook with Comali fame Ashwin Kumar. The movie did not do well at the box office but was considered one of the best works of Richard M Nathan. This the triangle love story was well made 

2022 has Bommai which is to be released, a romantic drama directed by Comedy King Radhamohan and stars SJ Surya and Priya Bhavani Shankar. 

His latest release is Kiruthiga Udhaiyanidhi Stalin's Paper Rocket which got worldwide release in Zee5 OTT. This travel script has Richard M Nathan's signature all over it. Every episode is musical. The combo of Kiruthiga and Richard has worked once more. 

Richard is currently working for Gatta Gusthi with Vishu Vishal and Ayshwarya Lekshmi as the lead. This is his first time partnership with Vishnu Vishal. The director Chella Ayyavu 's second project is a laughing riot family subject.

Filmography

As cinematographer

References

External links
 
 Official website

Living people
Loyola College, Chennai alumni
Tamil film cinematographers
Cinematographers from Tamil Nadu
Year of birth missing (living people)